O'Dell is a railway point on the British Columbia Railway north of Prince George, British Columbia.

References
BCGNIS Geographical Name Query

Rail transport in British Columbia
Prince George, British Columbia